The Netanya Tigers was an Israeli baseball team from Netanya in the Israel Baseball League.

The Tigers finished the inaugural 2007 season in fourth place, 19-21 (.475), and were defeated by the Bet Shemesh Blue Sox in the semifinals of the 2007 championship, 6-3.

History

The team's Manager was Israeli Ami Baran, who was originally frohistory Of ideal
The first player selected by the Tigers in the inaugural 2007 draft was outfielder Dan Rootenberg.  He is a former Midwood High School and Binghamton University left-handed hitting outfielder, who hit .407 for Binghamton during his senior year, garnering All-SUNYAC and All-State honors, played in the Frontier League, the Swiss professional league, and for the Pleasantville Red Sox, and in 2006 batted .351 in the Westchester Rockland Wood Bat League.  The first pitcher drafted by the Tigers was right-handed 6'5" pitcher Leon Feingold, who pitched for the State University of New York at Albany 1990-1994, the Cleveland Indians system from 1994-1995, the independent Atlantic League in 1999, and also played for the Pleasantville Red Sox.  Both Rootenberg and Feingold were among the group of four players first signed by the League.

Stadium
Located at the Sportek Baseball Field in Tel Aviv, due to a lack of appropriate facilities in Netanya.

Update
For the first week of the season the Tigers did not have a home field, due to stadium construction delays in Tel Aviv.  However, Sportek Stadium opened in mid-July 2007 at the intersection of Ibn Gvirol and Rokach Streets in Tel Aviv, and was home to both the Netanya Tigers and the Tel Aviv Lightning.

Roster

Footnotes

External links
Official site of the Netanya Tigers
Netanya Press Link

Baseball teams in Israel